I-361 may refer to:

, an Imperial Japanese Navy submarine commissioned in 1944 and sunk in 1945
Type D submarine, a class of Japanese submarines sometimes referred to as the I-361 class